On the Rocks is an album by the Byron Band, taking its name from their singer, British rock vocalist David Byron.

Despite featuring Byron and lauded guitarist Robin George the album didn't achieve commercial success.

The original UK vinyl release, on Creole Records, came with a poster of the sleeve's artwork.

It was first issued on CD in 1996, by the German specialist label Repertoire (Repertoire REP 431). This now-deleted edition had bonus tracks, as detailed below. For completists, the CD inlay-tray was cream in colour.

The album was re-released on CD in 2010, by Angel Air Records.

Track listing
All tracks composed by David Byron and Robin George; except where noted.
 "Rebecca" – 4:01
 "Bad Girl" – 4:52
 "How Do You Sleep" – 6:09
 "Little By Little" – 3:54 
 "Start Believing" – 4:04
 "Never Say Die" – 4:25
 "King" – 3:40
 "Piece of My Love" – 6:47

1993 CD release bonus tracks:
 "Every Inch of the Way"  (Byron, Boone)  – 3:25 / Single release
 "Routine" – 3:52 / B-side of "Every Inch of the Way"
 "Tired Eyes" – 2:39 / B-side of "Rebecca" single.
 "Every Inch of the Way" (Byron, Boone)  – 4:58 / Long version out-take, previously unreleased

Personnel
David Byron – vocals, executive producer, mixing
Robin George – guitars, bass guitar on "Little By Little", mixing, producer, arranger
Mel Collins – saxophones
Bob Jackson – keyboards
Roger Flavelle – bass
John Shearer – drums, percussion
The Powder Puffs – backing vocals
Technical
David Baker – engineer, mixing
Melvyn Abrahams – mastering
Lon Goddard – cover design

References

David Byron albums
1981 albums